Calycera is a genus of flowering plants in family Calyceraceae endemic to South America. It has been considered to contain 14 species, or more recently nine.

Species
Species include:
 Calycera calcitrapa
 Calycera crassifolia
 Calycera eryngioides
 Calycera herbacea
 Calycera horrida
 Calycera leucanthema
 Calycera pulvinata
 Calycera sessiliflora
 Calycera sympaganthera

References

Calyceraceae
Asterales genera
Taxa named by Antonio José Cavanilles